Wu Dexin (born 20 December 1936) is a Chinese female scientist specializing in semiconductor and integrated circuit. She is an academician of the Chinese Academy of Sciences.

Biography
Wu was born in Laoting County, Hebei, on 20 December 1936. After graduating from the Department of Radio Electronic Engineering, Tsinghua University in 1961, she was despatched to the Institute of Semiconductors, Chinese Academy of Sciences. She joined the Communist Party of China in January 1979. In 1986, she was transferred to CAS's Microelectronics Center (now Institute of Microelectronics) and appointed deputy director. In 1991 she was promoted to become director, a position she held until 1997. In 1992, she was employed by the State Science and Technology Commission (now Ministry of Science and Technology) as the chief scientist of the project "deep submicron structure devices and mesoscopic physics".

She was a delegate to the a member of the 9th Standing Committee of the National People's Congress.

Personal life
She was married to Wang Wei, who is also an academician of the Chinese Academy of Sciences.

Honours and awards
 1991 Chinese Academy of Sciences (CAS)
 1999 State Science and Technology Progress Award (Second Class) for the invention of a full set of 0.8 micron CMOS technology
 2004 Science and Technology Progress Award of the Ho Leung Ho Lee Foundation

References

External links
Biography of Wu Dexin on the Ho Leung Ho Lee Foundation
Wu Dexin on the Institute of Microelectronics, Chinese Academy of Sciences

1936 births
Living people
People from Laoting County
Scientists from Hebei
Tsinghua University alumni
Members of the Chinese Academy of Sciences
Chinese electrical engineers
Women electrical engineers
20th-century Chinese engineers
20th-century Chinese women scientists
20th-century women engineers
21st-century Chinese engineers
21st-century Chinese women scientists
21st-century women engineers